Digital security refers to various ways of protecting a computer's internet account and files from intrusion by an outside user or a hacker.

Computers and the Internet
Internet security is the protection of a computer's internet account and files from intrusion by an outside user. Internet users today are familiar with antivirus companies that provide them with internet security products to guard against computer viruses, or provide secure firewalls and protection against spyware. Organizations like the Center for Internet Security (CIS) provide enterprises with resources for measuring information security status and making rational security investment decisions.

An example of secure smart card technology usage is the Microsoft .NET card framework. This is a software framework that is available with several Microsoft Windows operating systems. It includes a library of coded solutions to prevent common programming problems and a virtual machine that manages the execution of programs written specifically for the framework.

Telecommunications
Perhaps the most widely known digitally secure telecommunication device is the SIM (Subscriber Identity Module) card, a device that is embedded in most of the world’s cellular devices before any service can be obtained. The SIM card is just the beginning of this digitally secure environment.

The Smart Card Web Servers draft standard (SCWS) defines the interfaces to an HTTP server in a smart card. Tests are being conducted to secure OTA ("over-the-air") payment and credit card information from and to a mobile phone. 
Combination SIM/DVD devices are being developed through Smart Video Card technology which embeds a DVD-compliant optical disc into the card body of a regular SIM card.

Other telecommunication developments involving digital security include mobile signatures, which use the embedded SIM card to generate a legally binding electronic signature.

Financial Transactions and Retail
The UCLA Internet Report: Surveying the Digital Future (2000) found that the privacy of personal data created barriers to online sales and that more than nine out of 10 internet users were somewhat or very concerned about credit card security.

The most common web technologies for improving security between browsers and websites are named SSL (Secure Sockets Layer), and its successor TLS (Transport Layer Security), identity management and authentication services, and domain name services allow companies and consumers to engage in secure communications and commerce. Several versions of SSL and TLS are commonly used today in applications such as web browsing, e-mail, internet faxing, instant messaging, and VoIP (voice-over-IP). There are various interoperable implementations of these technologies, including at least one implementation that is  open source. Open source allows anyone to view the application's source code, and look for and report vulnerabilities.

The credit card companies Visa and MasterCard cooperated to develop the secure EMV chip which is embedded in credit cards. Further developments include the Chip Authentication Program where banks give customers hand-held card readers to perform online secure transactions.

Other developments in this arena include the development of technology such as Instant Issuance which has enabled shopping mall kiosks acting on behalf of banks to issue on-the-spot credit cards to interested customers.

Travel and Transportation
Many modern passports are now biometric passports, containing an embedded microchip that stores a digitized photograph and personal information such as name, gender, and date of birth. In addition, more countries are introducing facial recognition technology to reduce identity-related fraud. The introduction of the ePassport has assisted border officials in verifying the identity of the passport holder, thus allowing for quick passenger processing. Plans are under way in the US, the UK, and Australia to introduce SmartGate kiosks with both retina and fingerprint recognition technology.

Additionally, e-Drivers’ licenses are being developed using the same technology. For example, Mexico’s licensing authority (ICV) has used a smart card platform to issue the first e-Drivers’ licenses to the city of Monterrey, in the state of Nuevo León.

The airline industry is moving from the use of traditional paper tickets towards the use of electronic tickets (e-tickets). These have been made possible by advances in online credit card transactions in partnership with the airlines. Long-distance bus companies are also switching over to e-ticketing transactions today.

Shipping companies have adopted RFID (Radio Frequency Identification) technology as an efficient, digitally secure, tracking device. Unlike a barcode, RFID can be read up to 20 feet away. RFID is used by FedEx and UPS.

Healthcare
Today many health-care providers and health insurance companies use the internet to provide enhanced products and services, for example through use of tele-health to potentially offer better quality and access to healthcare, or fitness trackers to lower insurance premiums.

The health care company Humana partners with WebMD, Oracle Corporation, EDS and Microsoft to enable its members to access their health care records, as well as to provide an overview of health care plans. Patient records are increasingly being placed on secure in-house networks, alleviating the need for extra storage space.

Secure access
The FBI, CIA, and Pentagon, all utilize secure controlled access technology for any of their buildings. However, the use of this form of technology is spreading into the entrepreneurial world. More and more companies are taking advantage of the development of digitally secure controlled access technology. GE's ACUVision, for example, offers a single panel platform for access control, alarm monitoring and digital recording.

New approaches combine network digital video recorder capabilities with intelligent access control and alarm monitoring panel functionality into a single image processing application. Some systems now combine digital video monitoring/recording/playback, access control and intrusion detection functionality in a single panel solution. With these integrated digital video recording and access control platforms, security officers can display live and stored video associated with alarm conditions and cardholder activity.

References

Digital technology